Krini is a village in the Kyrenia District of Cyprus. It is under the de facto control of Northern Cyprus.

Krini is the starting point of the Nicosia aqueduct.

References

Communities in Kyrenia District
Populated places in Girne District